Pak Hyon-il (born 21 September 1993) is a North Korean international footballer who plays as a defender.

International career

International goals
Scores and results list North Korea's goal tally first.

References

External links 
 
Pak Hyon-il at DPRKFootball

1993 births
Living people
North Korean footballers
North Korea international footballers
Association football defenders